Veeranarasanpettai is a village in the Thanjavur taluk of Thanjavur district, Tamil Nadu, India.

Demographics 

As per the 2001 census, Veeranarasanpettai had a total population of 750 with 366 males and 384 females. The sex ratio was 1049. The literacy rate was 58.55.

References 

 

Villages in Thanjavur district